The Little Mermaid: Splash Hits - New songs from the Popular TV series is a compilation album of songs from The Little Mermaid TV series, and is part of The Little Mermaid franchise.

Track list

References

The Little Mermaid (franchise)
1992 compilation albums
Disney albums